Arthur Durrant Brown,D.D. (1926–2011) was a Canadian Suffragan Bishop.

Brown was educated at the University of Western Ontario  and ordained in 1950. After a curacy in Pinkerton, Ontario  he held incumbencies at St Stephen, London, St JohnWindsor and St Michael, Toronto. He was Archdeacon of York, ON from 1974 to 1981 when he became Suffragan Bishop for the Diocese of Toronto.

References 

University of Western Ontario alumni
Anglican bishops of Toronto
20th-century Anglican Church of Canada bishops
Archdeacons of York, ON
1926 births
2011 deaths